Danny Lopez may refer to:

 Danny Lopez (boxer) (born 1952), American former boxer
 Danny Lopez (consul) (born 1974), British Consul General to New York
 Danny López Soto (1944–2011), legislator in Puerto Rico